is a railway station in Rankoshi, Isoya District, Hokkaidō, Japan. It is operated by JR Hokkaido and has the station number "S26". The station name is sometimes transliterated on railway maps and timetables as "Kombu Station".

Lines
Both local and the Rapid Niseko Liner services stop at the station.

Station layout
The station consists of a side platform serving a single track.

History
On 1 April 1987, with the privatization of Japanese National Railways (JNR), the successor of JGR, control of the station passed to JR Hokkaido.

See also
 List of railway stations in Japan

References

Railway stations in Japan opened in 1904
Niseko Station
Rankoshi, Hokkaido